Khakhra is a thin cracker common in the Gujarati  cuisine of western India, It is made from mat bean, wheat flour and oil. It is served usually during breakfast.

See also
 Gujarat
 Gujarati people
 Indian cuisine
 List of Indian breads

References

Indian snack foods
Gujarati cuisine
Indian breads